Anatomy of a Drum Solo is an instructional DVD by Rush drummer Neil Peart, presenting live and in-studio performances discussing his approach to soloing. Taking "Der Trommler", a drum solo recorded in September 2004 in Frankfurt, Germany as a framework, Peart presents the concepts and technique behind each segment of this nine-minute drum solo, which is a feature of each Rush live performance.

Anatomy of a Drum Solo also features: 
Two explorations - completely improvised workouts at the drums, each over 30 minutes long. 
A drum solo recorded in Hamburg, Germany in September, 2004.
"O Baterista", Neil's Grammy Award-nominated solo, from the Vapor Trails Tour. 
Two Rush performances from the Frankfurt 2004 concert, all shot from the perspective of the drum cameras.
Camera Option: During Peart's performance of "Der Trommler", the viewer can choose between the program edit and two isolated camera views. 
Alternate Edits: During parts of Peart's analysis of "Der Trommler" the viewer can choose between the program edit, or an alternate edit with the playing example shown full-screen without Peart's commentary.
Audio-only tracks: "Momo's Dance Party" and "Pieces of Eight", composed and performed by Peart, which can be accessed at various points in the program,
Interview with Paul Northfield, Rush co-producer and engineer, and Lorne Wheaton, Peart's drum technician.
Two Rush performances from the perspective of the drum cameras.
A previously unreleased solo from Rush's 1994 Counterparts Tour.

References
Anatomy of A Drum Solo S.l.: Hudson Music: Distributed by Hal Leonard. 2005. 

Neil Peart albums
Rush (band) live albums
Rush (band) video albums
Live video albums
2005 live albums
2005 video albums
Concert films